The Klamath Project is a water-management project developed by the United States Bureau of Reclamation to supply farmers with irrigation water and farmland in the Klamath Basin.  The project also supplies water to the Tule Lake National Wildlife Refuge, and the Lower Klamath National Wildlife Refuge.  The project was one of the first to be developed by the Reclamation Service, which later became the Bureau of Reclamation.

The two main water supply sources for the project are Upper Klamath Lake and the Klamath River.  The main bodies of water in the Klamath Project are Clear Lake Reservoir, Klamath River, Link River, Lost River, Lower Klamath Lake, Tule Lake, and Upper Klamath Lake. The project fills these reservoirs from the spring runoff, peaking generally in March and April, and keeps the runoff from flooding the historical marshes that are a large portion of the present farmland. There are also many minor streams in the area.  Lost River historically drained into Tule Lake, an endorheic lake.  The project now diverts excess Lost River water to the Klamath River, allowing portions of Tule Lake to be reclaimed.

Some  of rangeland have been transformed into active farmland through the Klamath Project. Of that total,  were recovered by draining a portion of Lower Klamath Lake, a shallow marsh straddling the Oregon-California border between the California towns of Dorris and Tulelake. Tule Lake was also reduced in size by diverting water from Lost River to the Klamath River.

Farmers in the project raise barley, alfalfa hay, and other hay, oats, potatoes, and wheat.  The Klamath Basin is on the Pacific Flyway and the Klamath Basin National Wildlife Refuges Complex is visited by migratory game birds every year.

The project should not be confused with the Klamath River Hydroelectric Project, a set of hydro dams on the mainstem of the Klamath operated by for-profit energy company PacifiCorp.  The Link River Dam belongs to both.

History

Construction began on the project in 1906 with the building of the main "A" Canal. Water was first made available May 22, 1907. The Clear Lake Dam was completed in 1910, the Lost River Diversion Dam and many of the distribution structures in 1912, and the Anderson-Rose Diversion Dam (formally Lower Lost River Diversion Dam) in 1921. The Malone Diversion Dam on Lost River was built in 1923 to divert water to Langell Valley.

A contract executed February 24, 1917, between the California-Oregon Power Company (now Pacific Power) and the United States authorized the company to construct the Link River Dam for the benefit of the project and for the company's use, and in particular extended to the water users of the Klamath Project certain preferential power rates. The dam was completed in 1921.

In more recent times, the Klamath Project has been the focus of nationwide controversy. The Lost River and Shortnose suckers were listed as endangered in 1988. This, as well as concerns for salmon runs, led to a cutoff of irrigation water to local farmers on April 6, 2001. After many protests by farmers and concerned citizens alike, the decision was reversed the next year. The impact of the salmon kill was detailed in the book Salmon is Everything.   A 2002 report by the National Research Council however, determined that the decision to stop delivery of irrigation water in 2001 was not scientifically justified and that the 2002 fish kill was caused by a combination of natural factors.

A massive die off of salmon occurred in 2002 due to low water and high temperatures in the lower reaches of the river during the salmon migration.  Studies showed that drought conditions and low flow from the entire drainage were among the factors that caused a unique mix of conditions to allow a gill rot disease to attack the salmon population.

The conflict in balancing the economic and ecological concerns of the region was the focus of the 2006 book River of Renewal: Myth and History in the Klamath Basin. Today, there is still much antagonism between opposing sides on this issue.

Engineering

Dams

The Klamath Project contains seven dams, all of them on tributaries of the Klamath River itself.  In chronological order of completion, they are:

 the Clear Lake Dam, completed in 1910, replaced 2002, for flood control and water storage.  It impounds Lost River to form Clear Lake Reservoir
 the Lost River Diversion Dam, completed in 1912, diverts the waters of the Lost River into the Klamath, thereby controlling flow into the adjacent Tule Lake National Wildlife Refuge and reclaimed parts of the Tule Lake bed
 the Link River Dam, completed in 1921 for flood control, water storage, and hydro power.  It impounds Link River to form Upper Klamath Lake
 the Anderson-Rose Diversion Dam, completed in 1921 as a diversion dam, on the Lost River close to Merrill, Oregon 
 the Malone Diversion Dam, finished in 1923, on the upper Lost River
 the Gerber Dam, completed in 1925 for water storage, impounding Miller Creek to form Gerber Reservoir

Canals
The canals transport irrigation water from Klamath Lake and the Klamath River, Clear Lake and the Lost River, and Tule Lake. There are two tunnels: the "A" Canal (the main canal that starts just above the Link River Dam) has an underground section as it flows through Klamath Falls, and the Tule Lake Tunnel.

There are almost  of drainage canals in the Klamath Project which allow land that would otherwise be wetlands to be farmed. The Lower Klamath Lake was  before it was drained and would naturally evaporate about  each summer. This is roughly equivalent to the annual delivery of the A canal.

Pumps

There are 28 pumping stations in the Klamath Project. These pumps have a total output of over 1937 ft³/s (55 m³/s).

Water management 

As opposed to the government-owned irrigation dams of the Klamath Project on upper tributaries, the seven dams of the Klamath River Hydroelectric Project are operated by for-profit energy company PacifiCorp.  The systems share one facility, the Link River Dam, which is owned by the United States Bureau of Reclamation but operated by PacifiCorp primarily to regulate its own downstream water supply, and secondarily for power generation.

Controversies over water management since 2001 have involved the entire river.  That year, a court order withheld irrigation water from Klamath Project farmers, to comply with mandated river levels for the threatened Coho salmon and the endangered Lost River Sucker.  Downstream populations of Coho salmon are within the Southern Oregon/Northern California Evolutionary Significant Unit and are listed as threatened (2011).

The 2010 Klamath Basin Restoration Agreement (KBRA) is a multi-party legal agreement determining river usage and water rights involving the Klamath River, the Klamath Project, and the Klamath Basin, within the states of California and Oregon.  Among the more notable signatories to the agreement were the Governors of California and Oregon, and the Chairman of the Klamath Tribes.

Goals
The Klamath Basin Restoration Agreement aims to: 
 assist restoration of Riparian zones along many of the rivers in the Klamath Basin
 remove four downstream hydro power dams on the Klamath River operated by PacifiCorp by 2020, with the goal of salmon restoration 
 provide irrigation water assurances for Klamath Basin farmers
 provide the Klamath Tribes with the 90,000 acre Mazama Tree Farm

References

External links

United States Bureau of Reclamation
Klamath Waters Digital Library
Historic American Engineering Record (HAER) documentation, filed under Klamath Falls, Klamath County, OR:

Klamath River
Interbasin transfer
United States Bureau of Reclamation
Water in Oregon
Water in California
Klamath County, Oregon
Historic American Engineering Record in Oregon
History of Modoc County, California
History of Siskiyou County, California
Hydroelectric power plants in Oregon
Klamath Mountains
Geography of Klamath County, Oregon
Geography of Modoc County, California
Geography of Siskiyou County, California